Benedetto Bartolo (1627–1684) was a Roman Catholic prelate who served as Bishop of Belcastro (1684–1685)
and Bishop of Lacedonia (1672–1684).

Biography
Benedetto Bartolo was born in Giarutana, Italy on 16 December 1627 and ordained a priest on 11 March 1668.
On 12 September 1672, he was appointed by Pope Clement X as Bishop of Lacedonia.
On 18 September 1672, he was consecrated bishop by Cesare Facchinetti, Bishop of Spoleto.
On 18 September 1684, he was appointed by Pope Innocent XI as Bishop of Belcastro.
He served as Bishop of Belcastro until his death in November 1685.

Episcopal succession
While bishop, he was the principal co-consecrator of:
Giambattista Morea, Bishop of Lacedonia (1684);
Pietro Luigi Malaspina, Bishop of Cortona (1684); and
Giovanni Riccanale, Bishop of Boiano (1684).

References

External links and additional sources
 (for Chronology of Bishops) 
 (for Chronology of Bishops) 
 (for Chronology of Bishops) 
 (for Chronology of Bishops) 

17th-century Italian Roman Catholic bishops
Bishops appointed by Pope Clement X
Bishops appointed by Pope Innocent XI
1627 births
1685 deaths